La Encarnación is a municipality in the Honduran department of Ocotepeque.

Demographics
At the time of the 2013 Honduras census, La Encarnación municipality had a population of 4,961. Of these, 95.62% were Mestizo, 2.24% White, 0.85% Indigenous, 0.06% Black or Afro-Honduran and 1.23% others.

References

Municipalities of the Ocotepeque Department